Milton is a district in the Scottish city of Glasgow, situated north of the River Clyde.

Location and history
The construction of Milton started in the late 1940s as a part of a general post-war construction programme by the Glasgow Corporation to deal with housing shortages and slum clearance. The district is bordered to the south and east by Ashgill Road, dividing it from the older Parkhouse neighbourhood. It is also bordered by Liddesdale Road, which had previously connected Colston to Balmore Road. The new streets were named after the Scottish islands: Berneray, Birsay, Castlebay, Cathay, Egilsay, Longay, Mingulay, Ornsay, Raasay, Ronaldsay, Scalpay, Scaraway, Shilay Skerray, Stornoway, Torogay, Vallay and Westray.

The area had only a few private homes (in Liddesdale Road/Birsay Road and Loskin Drive) prior to the new development. The initial scheme was completed in 1952. More housing was added in later years, including high-rise flats in Castlebay Drive in the late 1960s. Housing styles varied from gray stone apartment houses with back and front doors, to brown or white clad pre-fabricated apartments and 4 storey flats of 8 units each, some with open verandas. All housing was rented social housing.

Milton suffered from social problems such as gang fighting and drug abuse. The gang fighting caused urban decay by the end of the 1960s, and drug abuse made Milton one of the worst drug areas in United Kingdom.

In the late 1980s, many of the flats in the area were replaced with social housing units more suitable for urban living. The last of the original flats in Scaraway Street was demolished in 2006 and parts of the area stand desolate.

Politics 
Milton is part of the Glasgow North East constituency, which has been represented in the House of Commons by Anne McLaughlin of the Scottish National Party (SNP) from 2015 to 2017, and again from 2019 onwards.

Milton is part of the Glasgow Maryhill and Springburn constituency, and is represented by Bob Doris of the Scottish National Party in the Scottish Parliament.

At local Glasgow City Council level, Milton has formed a core part of the Canal ward since 2007.

Education 
Children attend the merged St. Ambrose and St. Augustine's schools known as St. Monica's (Milton) Primary School. This holds Milton's Community Campus. Non denomination schools in the area are Miltonbank Primary School and Chirnsyde Primary School.

Religion 
Catholic and Methodist churches are located in nearby Liddesdale Square. The Methodist Church shares a Minister with the Methodist Church in Kilsyth and Colston Milton Church in Egilsay Crescent (Church of Scotland). The Church of Scotland Manse is located on Birsay Road.

Services 

The scheme suffered from poor social planning. Pubs, cinemas or community amenities were accessible only by bus/car. A community centre was built in Liddesdale Road in the early 1970s. No factories or industry offered jobs in the area. The scheme was part of the Maryhill parliamentary constituency and is now within Glasgow North East.

The four shopping areas were Skerray Street, Scaraway Street, Westray Circus and Liddesdale Square. Buses 8, 29/129, M3 and 75 serve the area.

Community activists successfully campaigned to prevent the conversion of the site of the demolished Saint Augustine’s Secondary School into housing. Its future remains in doubt.

LoveMilton, a community development trust for the area, obtained planning permission for a multi-purpose, community facility.

Notable persons 
 Kenny Dalglish, footballer (Celtic, Liverpool and Scotland), whose first team played on the spare ground at Egilsay Street and was called "Milton Milan"
 Stephen Maguire, snooker player
 Frank McAvennie, footballer (Celtic, West Ham and Scotland)
 Dylan McGeouch, footballer (Celtic, Hibernian, Aberdeen and Scotland)

See also
Districts of Glasgow
 Glasgow tower blocks
Politics of Glasgow

References

External links
 Commonwealth Games pitches close
 Modern Times: 1950s to The Present Day
 Love Milton
 Streets of Glasgow
Milton profile (also includes Lambhill and Parkhouse) at Understanding Glasgow

Areas of Glasgow
Housing estates in Glasgow